The 1995 Stella Artois Championships was a men's tennis tournament played on outdoor grass courts at the Queen's Club in London in the United Kingdom and was part of the World Series of the 1995 ATP Tour. It was the 93rd edition of the tournament and was held from 12 June through 19 June 1995. First-seeded Pete Sampras won the singles title.

Finals

Singles

 Pete Sampras defeated  Guy Forget 7–6(7–3), 7–6(8–6)
 It was Sampras' 2nd title of the year and the 34th of his career.

Doubles

 Todd Martin /  Pete Sampras defeated  Jan Apell /  Jonas Björkman 7–6, 6–4
 It was Martin's 3rd title of the year and the 8th of his career. It was Sampras' 3rd title of the year and the 35th of his career.

References

External links
 Official website
 ATP tournament profile

 
Stella Artois Championships
Queen's Club Championships
Stella Artois Championships
Stella Artois Championships
Stella Artois Championships